Demotech, Inc. is an American insurance rating agency headquartered in Columbus, Ohio, that focuses on independent, regional and specialty companies in the Property and Casualty insurance (P&C) industry. It is independent from the companies that it rates.

Differences
An Insurance Rating Agency issues financial-strength ratings measuring a companies' ability to immediately pay claims presented.

A Credit Rating Agency issues financial-strength ratings measuring a companies' ability to pay back debt by making timely principal and interest payments and the likelihood of default.

Traditional companies such as AM Best, Moody's Investors Service, Standard and Poor’s and Fitch Ratings do rate insurance providers, but typically only large national companies. Demotech was founded in 1985 to provide financial analysis of, and actuarial services for, niche markets ignored by Big Three (credit rating agencies).  
The principals were Joseph and Sharon Romano Petrelli.

The U.S. Securities and Exchange Commission provides a list of Nationally recognized statistical rating organizations on their website.
As of August 2022, Demotech was one of ten organizations on that list.

Ratings
Demotech developed a rating system for independent, specialty and regional insurance carriers. The gather analyzed Annual & Quarterly statutory financial statements, Statements of actuarial opinion, Actuarial opinion summaries, Reinsurance information, Audit reports and discussions with Management. Then perform "an analysis of a series of quantitative ratios and certain qualitative considerations".

Demotech uses the registered term, Financial Stability Rating® (FSR) to judge an insurer's ability to perform in the general economy and the "underwriting cycle that exists in the insurance industry".

The company has eight levels of stability. The first five predict the percentage of insurers that will have a surplus 18 months after their rating no matter "the severity of a general economic downturn or deterioration in the insurance cycle".

Their FSRs were approved by Fannie Mae in 1989, Freddie Mac in 1990, and HUD in 1993. Following Hurricane Andrew in 1992, more than 20 insurance companies could not cover their losses and were taken over by the State of Florida. In 1996, the Florida Office of Insurance Regulation requested that Demotech rate new Property & Casualty Insurance companies doing business in Florida. Because newly capitalized insurers do not have the financial records typically utilized, a new process was developed using 
business plans; pro forma financial statements; administrative agreements; marketing & sales materials; job descriptions of key personnel; investment policy statement; claims department procedures & practices; initial rate, rule, & form filings; biographies of critical employees, service providers & principals; reinsurance data; catastrophe modeling reports; and underwriting guidelines & application. As of 2014, the company was reviewing/rating companies that write about 60% of those policies in Florida and were reviewing/rating over 400 insurance carriers nationwide.

Demotech issues financial stability ratings for 50 Florida-based insurers. On March 23, 2022 the top five executives from Demotech sent a letter to Florida's Governor Ron DeSantis plus the Senator and House leadership entreating them to pass reforms before the start of Atlantic hurricane season June 1. Failure to do so would cause Demotech to downgrade the financial stability ratings for "a number" of Florida insurers.  The letter stated: "The conditions of the property insurance marketplace in Florida are unsustainable, and without the necessary corrective action, many Florida insurers will struggle to maintain adequate surplus, efficient capital sources will avoid the market, private reinsurance costs will become prohibitively expensive, and consumers will ultimately bear the cost.”

Comparisons
In 2011, The Florida State University College of Business, Risk Management and Insurance compared Demotech FSRs with insurer 
ratings issued by AM Best plus the Big Three (credit rating agencies). Their independent study reviewed thousands of insurer 
ratings issued over nine years. The resulting paper was “A Comprehensive Examination of Insurer Financial Strength 
Ratings,” and its executive summary contained the following conclusions:

 ratings comparisons between Demotech and others show "relative consistency"
 Demotech serves a unique group of insurers
 there is general consistency in the firms that each agency would categorize as financially secure
 the comparability between Demotech and others has "important public policy implications for insurers, regulators and consumers"
 Demotech provides an important service within the ratings community and plays a very important role in the insurance market.

Title Insurance
Demotech has published, Performance of Title Insurance Companies since 1988. The data is released annually and updated quarterly. It represents over 99% of the premium volume in the Title Industry and Demotech claims it "is the most complete and thorough industry analysis available".

Awards
 ACQ Global Awards 2014 — US — Niche Financial Analysis Provider of the Year (Insurance) award  
 ACQ Global Awards 2015 — US — Niche Financial Analysis Provider of the Year (Insurance) award 
 ACQ Global Awards 2015 — US — Gamechanger of the Year (Financial Analysis) award  
 Finance Monthly’s Innovation and Excellence Awards 2015 — USA — Excellence in Financial Analysis award

References

External links
 
 SEC website of Current NRSROs

Companies based in Franklin County, Ohio
Credit rating agencies
Insurance companies of the United States
Insurance industry organizations
Financial services companies established in 1985